HLA-DR14(DR14) is a HLA-DR serotype that recognizes the DRB1*1401 to *1408, *1410 to *1418, and other *14 gene products. DR14 serotype is a split antigen of the older HLA-DR6 serotype group which also contains the similar HLA-DR13 antigens.

Alleles

Serotypes are unknown the following alleles: DRB1**1409,  *1419 to *1462

Disease associations
DRB1*1402: juvenile rheumatoid arthritis, increased longevity in Okinawans.

Extended linkage
DR*14:DQ5 haplotype: increased risk for non-AChR autoantibodies in myasthenia gravis.

Genetic Linkage

HLA-DR13 is genetically linked to HLA-DR52 and HLA-DQ5 (HLA-DQ1) serotypes.

References

6